Carex abrupta is a species of sedge known by the common name abrupt-beaked sedge or abruptbeak sedge. It is native to the western United States from California to Idaho, where it grows in moist mountain habitat such as meadows.

Description
This sedge forms a dense, erect clump exceeding 20 centimeters in height. The inflorescence is a rounded cluster of spikes 1 to 2 centimeters wide. Each fruit is surrounded by a sac called a perigynium which is boat-shaped to scoop-shaped with a very narrow, cylindrical beak coppery red to dark brown in color.

External links
Calflora: Carex abrupta (Abrupt beaked sedge)
Jepson Manual (TJM2) treatment of Carex abrupta
Flora of North America
Carex abrupta - Photo gallery

abrupta
Flora of California
Flora of Idaho
Flora of Nevada
Flora of Oregon
Flora of the Sierra Nevada (United States)
Plants described in 1917
Taxa named by Kenneth Kent Mackenzie
Flora without expected TNC conservation status